(Percy) Paul Selver (22 March 1888 – 6 April 1970) was an English writer and translator. A prolific translator of Czech literature into English, he was best known as the translator of Karel Čapek.

Life
Paul Selver was born to a Jewish family, the son of Wolfe and Catherine (Minden) Selver. He gained a B.A. in English and German from the University of London. After serving in the army during World War I he became a translator, novelist, and contributor to Alfred Richard Orage's magazine The New Age.

Selver spoke and translated from several Germanic and Slavonic languages. In World War II he was a linguistic assistant to the exiled Czech government, but was dismissed when the Communists took over. In 1968 he was awarded a Civil List pension for his services to literature. He died on 6 April 1970, his wife having died six months earlier.

Works

Translations
 (ed.) An anthology of modern Bohemian poetry. London: Henry J. Drane, 1912
 (ed. with intro.) Modern Russian poetry: texts and translations, London & New York: Kegan Paul, Trench, Trubner, & co., 1917.
 'The Woman' and 'The Invincible Ship' in People of the Universe: four Serbo-Croatian plays by Josip Kosor. London: Hendersons, 1917.
 (ed. with intro.) Anthology of modern Slavonic literature in prose and verse, London: Kegan Paul & Co., 1919.
 (ed. with intro.) Modern Czech poetry: selected texts with translations and an introduction. London & New York: K. Paul, Trench, Trubner & Co. Ltd., 1920.
 (with Jaroslav Císař and František Pokorný) The Czechoslovak Republic : its economical, industrial and cultural resources, Prague: L'effort de la Tchécoslovaquie, 1920.
 Poems by Sigbjørn Obstfelder. Translated from the Norwegian. Oxford, 1920. (Norwegian and English on facing pages.)
 Poems by Jens Peter Jacobsen. Oxford, 1920.
 The jail experiences in 1916 by Josef Svatopluk Machar. Oxford: B. Blackwell, 1921.
 And so ad infinitum (The life of the insects) : an entomological review, in three acts, a prologue and an epilogue by Karel Čapek and Josef Čapek. Freely adapted for the English stage by Nigel Playfair and Clifford Bax. London: Humphrey Milford, 1923.
 R.U.R. Rossum's Universal Robots: a play in three acts and an epilogue by Karel Čapek. Adapted for the London stage by Nigel Playfair. London: Oxford University Press, 1923.
 Letters from England by Karel Čapek. London: Geoffrey Bles, 1925.
 The land of many names: a play in three acts and a transformation by Josef Čapek. London: G. Allen & Unwin ltd., 1926.
 The Macropulos secret: a comedy by Karel Čapek
 My war memoirs by Edvard Beneš. London: Allen and Unwin, 1928.
 Music of the heart: selected poems by Emanuel Lešehrad. Prague: K. Zink, 1929.
 (ed.) An anthology of Czechoslovak literature, London, : K. Paul, Trench, Trubner & co., ltd., 1929.
 The good soldier Schweik by Jaroslav Hašek. London: Heinemann, 1930.
 Letters from Spain by Karel Čapek. London: Geoffrey Bles, 1931.
 Tales from two pockets by Karl Čapek. London: Faber & Faber ltd., 1932.
 Thirty Years in the Golden North by Jan Welzl. Edited by Edward Valenta and B. Golombek. London: G. Allen & Unwin, 1932.
 Letters from Holland by Karel Čapek. London : Faber and Faber, 1933.
 The wizard of Menlo by Edmund Konrad. London: K.S. Bhat, 1935.
 The wounded dragon by Francis de Croisset. London : Geoffrey Bles, 1937.
 (tr. with Ralph Neale) Power and glory: a drama in three acts by Karel Čapek. London : G. Allen & Unwin, ltd., 1938.
 Blackmail or war by Geneviève Tabouis. Harmondsworth: Penguin Books, 1938.
 The mother: a play in three acts, London: Allen & Unwin, 1939.
 And this: our life by Jacqueline Vincent. Translated from the French L'enfant qui passe. London, 1939.
 Central stores by Vicki Baum. Translated from the German Der grosse ausverkauf. London: Bles, 1940.
 Hollar : a Czech émigré in England by Johannes Urzidil. London: The "Czechoslovak", 1942.
 "Panslavism" past and present by Vladimir Clementis. London : Czechoslovak Committee from Slav Reciprocity, 1943.
 A Complicated Affair; or, Alias Weiskopf by František Kubka. London : Ćechoslovák, 1944.
 Mademoiselle de Maupin by Théophile Gautier. Translated from the French. London: Hamish Hamilton, 1948.
 Gabrielle by Christine Brueckner. London: Robert Hale, 1956.
 Khrushchev of the Ukraine : a biography by Victor Alexandrov. London: Gollancz, 1957.
 The House of Crystal by Hans Kades. London: Angus & Robertson, 1957.
 The Pursuer by Günther Weisenborn. London: Heinemann, 1962.

Novels
 Schooling, London: Jarrolds, 1924.
 One, Two, Three, London : Jarrolds, 1926.
 Private Life, London : Jarrolds Publishers Ltd, 1929.

Poetry
 Personalities, London: George Allen & Unwin, 1918
 A baker's dozen of tin trumpets, and two others of different metal, London, S. Nott, 1935.

Autobiography
 (as Mark Grossek) First movement. London, 1937.

Other
 (ed. with intro., notes and vocab.) The chameleon and four other tales by Anton Chekhov. London: Kegan Paul & Co., 1916.
 'London mourning', Today, No. 30, Vol. 5 (August 1919)
 Otakar Březina : a study in Czech literature, Oxford : B. Blackwell, 1921.
 Czech self-taught by the natural method with phonetic pronunciation: Thimm's system. London: E. Marlborough & Co, ltd., 1927.
 Masaryk: a biography, London: M. Joseph, 1940
 Czechoslovak literature, an outline, London : G. Allen & Unwin, 1942
 Slovníček Anglického Slangu. Glossary of English slang with Czech equivalents. London: G. Allen & Unwin Ltd., 1942
 A century of Czech and Slovak poetry, London: New Europe Publishing Co.; Prague Press, 1946.
 English phraseology. A dictionary containing more than 5,000 idiomatic and colloquial words and expressions, London, J. Brodie, 1957.
 Orage and the New Age circle: reminiscences and reflections, London: Allen & Unwin, 1959
 France under Napoleon III, London: James Brodie, 1961.
 'Preface' to Song out of darkness: selected poems by Vera Rich. London : Mitre Press, 1961.
 More English phraseology : a supplementary volume to the popular 'English phraseology', Bath: James Brodie, 1965
 The Art of Translating Poetry, London: John Baker Publishers Ltd., 1966

References

External links

 
 
 

1888 births
1970 deaths
Translators from Czech
Translators to English
20th-century translators